Loxophlebia metamela is a moth of the subfamily Arctiinae. It was described by Paul Dognin in 1911. It is found in South America.

References

External Links 
 Natural History Museum Lepidoptera generic names catalog

Loxophlebia
Moths described in 1911